Changamwe is a suburb of Mombasa, in Mombasa County, in the former Coast Province of Kenya.

Geography 
The area is primarily industrial, with a number of modern concrete tower blocks housing residents.  Industries include refineries and various process industries.  There is a franchise of Barclays Bank located on the major Mombasa-Nairobi road.

Transport 
The district is located on the Kenyan mainland, and Mombasa Island is accessible by road, rail and on foot via the Makupa Causeway.

Electoral constituencies
Changamwe Constituency

References 

Mombasa County
Populated places in Coast Province